East Kent Sudbury is a home education learning community in Deal, Kent in the United Kingdom. The community operates on Sudbury school principles, that opened in January 2019 and has attracted controversy.

Situation
EKS is now situated in Ringwould nr Deal on a beautiful site developed for outdoor learning. In addition Kent still runs a system of selective education, with secondary modern schools, now called high schools or academies with grammar schools for the minority. London schools are fully comprehensive.

History
Co-Founder, Kezia Cantwell-Wright, who is an alumnus of A.S Neill's Summerhill was already home educating her children and sought a school with the principles of self-direction and democracy. Finding none in the area or indeed the UK she, alongside Kate Coleman and others, then embarked on founding the UK's first Sudbury model school.

Plans

The opening will be gradual, in January 2019 it offered part-time provision for home-schooled children, using rented space in the Cliftonville community centre. It offers a sliding scale fee structure and aims to be as inclusive as possible. In 2020 EKS   moved to River, Dover and then in July 2022 settled into their forever home at Rippledown House in Ringwould near Deal.

See also
List of Sudbury schools

References

External links

Alternative education
Kent
Sudbury Schools